Los Conquistadores was a heel jobber professional wrestling tag team in the World Wrestling Federation (WWF), consisting of two masked wrestlers known as One (or Spanish Uno for "one") and Two (or Spanish Dos for "two"). The original team consisted of José Estrada Sr. and Jose Luis Rivera.

Several other wrestlers made use of the gimmick in 2000 and 2003. Edge and Christian and the Hardy Boyz both won the WWF World Tag Team Championship as Los Conquistadores, although their reigns were later credited under their actual team names.

History

1987
The Shadows was the name of a masked heel jobber professional wrestling tag team in the WWF in 1987. The team consisted of two masked wrestlers known as Light and Dark or simply "Shadow No. 1" and "Shadow No. 2". Randy Colley was "Shadow No. 1", and Jose Luis Rivera who was "Shadow No. 2". Colley was previously part of the tag team Demolition as the original Smash, and before that a tag team called The Moondogs as Moondog Rex and was a one-time WWF Tag Team Champion with Moondog King and then later Moondog Spot.

The Moondogs were very successful since they had held the WWF tag team title once as well having won many tag team titles in the World Wrestling Council (WWC). Rivera had wrestled in the WWF before as The Red Demon, and under his real name, and under both identities wrestled against both babyfaces and heels. Shortly after Colley left Demolition and was replaced by Barry Darsow, Colley and Rivera would form the masked Shadows tag-team, and they would make their debut as a team in Worcester, Massachusetts, on March 17, 1987, at a house show defeating the team of Lanny Poffo and Nick Kiniski, and The Shadows would have their first TV match also in Worcester, Massachusetts, on April 23, 1987, when they teamed with fellow jobber "Iron" Mike Sharp and lost to Blackjack Mulligan, Billy Jack Haynes and Tito Santana.

The Shadows also had a few matches against The Rockers (Shawn Michaels and Marty Jannetty) during the Rockers first stint in the WWF (which only lasted two weeks, and which after they were fired) in 1987. Since the Shadows wore matching outfits of either black or white or black or grey and had nearly identical builds, the referees could not tell them apart, which allowed the team to make a lot of illegal switches during matches. The Shadows would also have a minor feud with The Killer Bees (a team composed of "Jumpin'" Jim Brunzell and B. Brian Blair) and would lose every match they had with the Bees. The Shadows scored a rare victory in Detroit, Michigan when the defeated they team of S. D. Jones and Lanny Poffo.

The Shadows faced many top tag-teams like The Fabulous Rougeaus (Jacques and Raymond), The Can-Am Connection, (Rick Martel and Tom Zenk), and Strike Force (Rick Martel and Tito Santana), and gave those teams many hard matches, though the Shadows always lost. The Shadows had very little success and never appeared on a pay-per-view card, though they did appear on a Coliseum WWF home video VHS cassette called WWF High Flyers in which they had a match against the team of Paul Roma and Jim Powers, (known as The Young Stallions), and it was a match that which the Shadows had with the Stallions where Vince McMahon called Roma and Powers "two young stallions" thus naming the team.

The Shadows would lose every match they had with the Stallions through early to mid 1987, and although Rivera was able to beat Jim Powers in some house show matches, but he did not keep his winning streak as Powers would avenge his loss with a victory over Rivera in a house show match in October 1987. Rivera's partner Colley would also lose a match to Powers' partner Roma at a Boston Gardens house show. Colley and Rivera would continue to wrestle exclusively at house shows and wouldn't reappear on TV until November 17. Shortly after the Shadows then quietly disbanded. After the Shadows disbanded, Colley then left the WWF and joined Continental Wrestling, while Rivera stayed with the WWF and formed Los Conquistadores with José Estrada Sr.

1987–1990
The original Conquistadors were a masked foreign heel team consisting of Puerto Rican wrestlers José Estrada Sr. and José Luis Rivera, billed as being "from somewhere in Latin America", who were used mainly as enhancement talent.

They had one pay-per-view appearance, as part of the 10-team elimination match at the Survivor Series 1988, where The Conquistadors and The Powers of Pain were the last two teams left in the ring. After shocking the wrestling world by outlasting several formidable tandems, The Conquistadors eventually lost when Mr. Fuji tripped up Uno and The Barbarian hit him with a headbutt to win the match for The Powers of Pain. The Conquistadors spent the rest of 1988 and 1989 jobbing to established teams, except some rare victories including a win over the Young Stallions, two wins over The Rockers, a win over The Killer Bees, wins over the teams of Terry Taylor and Sam Houston, jobber tag teams Brady Boone and Omar Atlas, and John Latu and Bob Emory, and a victory over The Fabulous Rougeaus in Canada in a heel vs heel match.

In 1989, Estrada started to appear on his own as “The Conquistador” while Rivera appeared only sporadically before both men left the WWF. In April 1991, The Conquistadors wrestled in All Star Championship Wrestling in a match defeating The Power Twins by DQ.

2000
In the year 2000, Edge and Christian engaged in a lengthy feud, with The Hardy Boyz capturing the WWF Tag Team Championship from Edge and Christian in a steel cage match at Unforgiven. The following day the Hardys won a ladder match that included a stipulation barring Edge and Christian from receiving another title shot for the duration of the Hardy Boyz' championship reign.

Weeks later, Los Conquistadors made their return, though they didn't physically resemble Rivera and Estrada; rather, the team looked and acted more like Edge and Christian, a suspicion that was boosted by Los Conquistadors immediately targeting the Hardy Boyz in the hopes of getting a shot at the titles. They later won a tag-team battle royal on SmackDown! to earn a title shot. After the match, a vignette showed Los Conquistadors being congratulated backstage by Edge and Christian. Since they were seen with Los Conquistadors, Edge and Christian claimed there was no way they could be Los Conquistadors. Their title shot came at No Mercy, where they defeated the Hardys using tactics similar to those employed by Edge and Christian, including Conquistador Dos using Christian's finisher the Unprettier to win the match. Backstage, Edge and Christian, looking like they had just come out of the showers, politely challenged Los Conquistadors for a title shot the next night. On Raw the following night, Edge looked confident as he made his way through the backstage area toward the ring, until he found Christian seemingly put through a table. Edge was left to fight Los Conquistadors by himself, and was shocked when they quickly defeated him. When Christian showed up at ringside, Los Conquistadors unmasked themselves, revealing themselves to be Matt Hardy and Jeff Hardy. They explained that they had attacked Edge and Christian's hired goons (Christopher Daniels and Aaron Aguilera, who had doubled for Los Conquistadors in backstage segments) backstage and stole the costumes.

As Edge and Christian complained, it was declared that Edge and Christian's title victory the previous night was official. At the same time, because the Hardy Boyz had just defeated the champions, commissioner Mick Foley ruled they were now the tag team champions. After being outsmarted by the Hardy Boyz, Edge and Christian gave up the golden costumes of Los Conquistadors. In line with the stipulations of the prior ladder match, the ban on Edge and Christian challenging for the championships had ended when "Los Conquistadors" defeated the Hardy Boyz for the titles, so Edge and Christian could wrestle for the titles again without disguises.

2003
On the July 17, 2003 edition of SmackDown!, Rob Conway and Nick Dinsmore assumed the roles of Los Conquistadors in a match in which they were defeated by Rey Mysterio and Billy Kidman. Unlike previous versions of Los Conquistadors, Conway and Dinsmore wore black and gold masks with exposed mouths along with blue shoulder pads.

On July 27, 2003, another set of Conquistadors participated in the APA Invitational Barroom Brawl Match at Vengeance, where they were beaten up by the APA. In this case, the men under the masks were Rob Conway and Johnny Jeter, who were both working in Ohio Valley Wrestling at the time.

2018
On the October 8, 2018 episode of Raw, a man dressed in a Conquistador outfit, later revealed to be Kurt Angle, won a WWE World Cup Qualifying Battle Royal by last eliminating Baron Corbin. The next week on Raw, jobber Billy Bain dressed as a Conquistador (assumed to be Angle) to take on The Authors of Pain in a losing effort.

Other media
The Los Conquistadors costumes of Edge and Christian were made available as alternative outfits in the video game WWE SmackDown vs. Raw 2011.

Championships and accomplishments
New England Pro Wrestling Hall of Fame
Class of 2014 (José Luis Rivera)
 World Wrestling Federation
 WWF World Tag Team Championship  - Edge and Christian (1), The Hardy Boyz (1)
World Wrestling League
Salón de los Inmortales 2015 (José Estrada, Sr.)
Salón de los Inmortales 2016 (José Luis Rivera)

References

Articles containing video clips
Fictional South American people
Masked tag teams
Professional wrestling gimmicks
WWE teams and stables